A turnaround stock is a stock of a company that has hit some trouble and very well might get things better. This makes the stock go up quite a bit.

See also
Value stock

External links
Turnaround Stocks Of The Forbes 400
A Late-Summer Look at the Turnaround Stocks

Valuation (finance)
Stock market
Investment